is a Japanese video game series and media franchise created by Sega. The franchise follows Sonic, an anthropomorphic blue hedgehog who battles the evil Doctor Eggman, a mad scientist. The main Sonic the Hedgehog games are platformers mostly developed by Sonic Team; other games, developed by various studios, include spin-offs in the racing, fighting, party and sports genres. The franchise also incorporates printed media, animations, feature films, and merchandise.

Sega developed the first Sonic game, released in 1991 for the Sega Genesis, to compete with Nintendo's mascot Mario. Its success helped Sega become one of the leading video game companies during the fourth generation of video game consoles in the early 1990s. Sega Technical Institute developed the next three Sonic games, plus the spin-off Sonic Spinball (1993). A number of Sonic games were also developed for Sega's 8-bit consoles, the Master System and Game Gear. After a hiatus during the unsuccessful Saturn era, the first major 3D Sonic game, Sonic Adventure, was released in 1998 for the Dreamcast. Sega exited the console market and shifted to third-party development in 2001, continuing the series on Nintendo, Xbox, and PlayStation systems.

While Sonic games often have unique game mechanics and stories, they feature recurring elements such as the ring-based health system, level locales, and fast-paced gameplay. Games typically feature Sonic setting out to stop Eggman's schemes for world domination, and the player navigates levels that include springs, slopes, bottomless pits, and vertical loops. Later games added a large cast of characters; some, such as Miles "Tails" Prower, Knuckles the Echidna, and Shadow the Hedgehog, have starred in spin-offs. The franchise has crossed over with other video game franchises in games such as Mario & Sonic, Sega All-Stars, and Super Smash Bros.

Series sales and free-to-play mobile game downloads totaled  . The Genesis Sonic games have been described as representative of the culture of the 1990s and listed among the greatest of all time. Although later games, notably the 2006 series reboot, received poorer reviews, Sonic is influential in the video game industry and is frequently referenced in popular culture. The franchise is known for its fandom that produces unofficial media, such as fan art and fangames.

History

1990–1991: Conception and first game

By 1990, the Japanese video game company Sega wanted a foothold in the video game console market with its 16-bit console, the Sega Genesis. Sega's efforts had been stymied by the dominance of Nintendo; the Genesis did not have a large install base and Nintendo did not take Sega seriously as a competitor. Sega of America CEO Michael Katz attempted to challenge Nintendo with the "Genesis does what Nintendon't" marketing campaign and by collaborating with athletes and celebrities to create games. These efforts did not break Nintendo's dominance, and Katz was replaced by Tom Kalinske, formerly of Mattel.

Sega president Hayao Nakayama decided Sega needed a flagship series and mascot to compete with Nintendo's Mario franchise. Nintendo had recently released Super Mario Bros. 3, at the time the bestselling video game ever. Sega's strategy had been based on porting its successful arcade games to the Genesis; however, Nakayama recognized that Sega needed a star character in a game that could demonstrate the power of the Genesis's hardware. An internal contest was held to determine a flagship game, with a focus on the American audience. Among the teams working on proposals were artist Naoto Ohshima and programmer Yuji Naka. The gameplay of Sonic the Hedgehog (1991) originated with a tech demo created by Naka, who had developed an algorithm that allowed a sprite to move smoothly on a curve by determining its position with a dot matrix. Naka's prototype was a platform game that involved a fast-moving character rolling in a ball through a long winding tube. Sega management accepted the duo's project and they were joined by designer Hirokazu Yasuhara.

After Yasuhara joined Naka and Ohshima, their focus shifted to the protagonist, who Sega hoped could become its mascot. The protagonist was initially a rabbit able to grasp objects with prehensile ears, but the concept proved too complex for the hardware. The team moved on to animals that could roll into a ball, and eventually settled on Sonic, a teal hedgehog created by Ohshima. Naka's prototype was expanded with Ohshima's character design and levels conceived by Yasuhara. Sonic's color was chosen to match Sega's cobalt blue logo, and his red and white shoes were inspired by the cover of Michael Jackson's 1987 album Bad. His personality was based on Bill Clinton's "can-do" attitude. The antagonist, Doctor Eggman, was another character Ohshima had designed for the contest. The team thought the abandoned design was excellent and redesigned it as a villain. The team took the name Sonic Team for the game's release.

Sonic's first appearance came in Sega AM3's racing game Rad Mobile (1991) five months before the release of Sonic the Hedgehog, as an ornament hanging from the driver's rearview mirror. The Sonic developers let AM3 use Sonic because they were interested in making him visible to the public. According to Mark Cerny, who worked in Tokyo as an intermediary between the Japanese and American Sega offices, the American staff felt that Sonic had no appeal. Although Katz was certain that Sonic would not be popular with American children, Kalinske arranged to place Sonic the Hedgehog as the pack-in game with the Genesis. Featuring speedy gameplay, Sonic the Hedgehog received critical acclaim. It greatly increased the popularity of the Sega Genesis in North America, credited with helping Sega gain 65% of the market share against Nintendo.

1991–1995: Genesis sequels
Naka was dissatisfied with his treatment at Sega and felt he received little credit for his involvement in the success. He quit but was hired by Cerny to work at the US-based Sega Technical Institute (STI), with a higher salary and more creative freedom. Yasuhara also decided to move to STI. STI began work on Sonic the Hedgehog 2 (1992) in November 1991. Level artist Yasushi Yamaguchi designed Sonic's new sidekick, Tails, a flying two-tailed fox inspired by the mythological kitsune. Like its predecessor, Sonic the Hedgehog 2 was a major success, but its development suffered from the language barrier and cultural differences between the Japanese and American developers. While STI developed Sonic 2, Ohshima led a team in Japan to create Sonic CD for the Genesis's CD-ROM accessory, the Sega CD; it was conceived as an enhanced port of Sonic 2, but evolved into a separate project.

Once development on Sonic 2 concluded, Cerny departed and was replaced by Roger Hector. STI divided into two teams: the Japanese developers led by Naka, and the American developers. The Japanese began work on Sonic the Hedgehog 3. It was initially developed as an isometric game using the Sega Virtua Processor chip, but was restarted as a more conventional side-scrolling game after the chip was delayed. It introduced Sonic's rival Knuckles, created by artist Takashi Thomas Yuda. Due to an impending promotion with McDonald's and cartridges size constraints, the project was split in two: the first half, Sonic 3, was released in February 1994, and the second, Sonic & Knuckles, a few months later. The Sonic & Knuckles cartridge contains an adapter that allows players to connect it to Sonic 3, creating a combined game, Sonic 3 & Knuckles. Sonic 3 and Sonic & Knuckles, as with their predecessors, were acclaimed. To release a Sonic game in time for the 1993 holiday shopping season, Sega commissioned the American team to make a new game, the spin-off Sonic Spinball. While Spinball received poor reviews, it sold well and helped build the reputation of its developers.

A number of Sonic games were developed for Sega's 8-bit consoles, the Master System and the handheld Game Gear. The first, an 8-bit version of the original Sonic, was developed by Ancient to promote the Game Gear and released in December 1991. Aspect Co. developed most of the subsequent 8-bit Sonic games, beginning with a version of Sonic 2. Other Sonic games released during this period include Dr. Robotnik's Mean Bean Machine (1993), a Western localization of the Japanese puzzle game Puyo Puyo (1991), SegaSonic the Hedgehog (1993), an arcade game featuring isometric gameplay, and Knuckles' Chaotix (1995), a spin-off for the Genesis's 32X add-on starring Knuckles.

1995–1998: Saturn era 

Following the release of Sonic & Knuckles, Yasuhara quit Sega and Naka returned to Japan, having been offered a role as a producer. He was reunited with Ohshima and brought with him Takashi Iizuka, who had worked with Naka's team at STI. With Naka's return, Sonic Team was officially formed as a brand. Sonic Team began to work on a new intellectual property, Nights into Dreams (1996), for Sega's 32-bit Saturn console. In 1996, towards the end of the Genesis's lifecycle, Sega released Sonic 3D Blast, an isometric game based on the original Sonic 3 concept, as the system still had a large install base. It was the final Sonic game produced for the Genesis, and was developed as a swan song for the system. Since Sonic Team was preoccupied with Nights into Dreams, 3D Blast was outsourced to the British studio Traveller's Tales. While 3D Blast sold well, it was criticized for its gameplay, controls, and slow pace.

Meanwhile, in America, STI worked on Sonic X-treme, a 3D Sonic game for the Saturn intended for the 1996 holiday shopping season. Development was hindered by disputes between Sega of America and Japan, Naka's reported refusal to let STI use the Nights game engine, and problems adapting the series to 3D. After two lead developers became ill, X-treme was canceled. Journalists and fans have speculated about the impact X-treme might have had if it was released, with producer Mike Wallis believing it "definitely would have been competitive" with the first 3D Mario game, Super Mario 64 (1996). Due to X-treme cancellation, Sega ported Sonic 3D Blast to the Saturn with updated graphics and bonus levels developed by Sonic Team.

In 1997, Sega announced "Project Sonic", a promotional campaign aimed at increasing market awareness of and renewing excitement for the Sonic brand. The first Project Sonic release was Sonic Jam, a compilation of the main Genesis Sonic games which included a 3D overworld Sonic Team used to experiment with 3D Sonic gameplay. Sonic Team and Traveller's Tales collaborated again on the second Project Sonic game, Sonic R, a 3D racing game and the only original Sonic game for the Saturn. Sonic Jam was well received, while Sonic R reviews were more divided. The cancellation of Sonic X-treme, as well as the Saturn's general lack of Sonic games, are considered important factors in the Saturn's commercial failure. According to Nick Thorpe of Retro Gamer, "By mid-1997 Sonic had essentially been shuffled into the background... it was astonishing to see that just six years after his debut, Sonic was already retro."

1998–2005: Transition to 3D 

With its Sonic Jam experiments, Sonic Team began developing a 3D Sonic platformer for the Saturn. The project stemmed from a proposal by Iizuka to develop a Sonic role-playing video game (RPG) with an emphasis on storytelling. Development moved to Sega's new console, the Dreamcast, which Naka believed would allow for the ultimate Sonic game. Sonic Adventure, directed by Iizuka and released in 1998, was one of the first sixth-generation video games. It introduced elements that became series staples, such as artist Yuji Uekawa's new character designs influenced by comics and animation. In 1999, Iizuka and 11 other Sonic Team members relocated to San Francisco and established Sonic Team USA to develop the more action-oriented Sonic Adventure 2 (2001). Between the releases, Ohshima left Sega to form Artoon. While both Adventure games were well received and the first sold over two million copies, consumer interest in the Dreamcast quickly faded, and Sega's attempts to spur sales through lower prices and cash rebates caused escalating financial losses.

In January 2001, Sega announced it was discontinuing the Dreamcast to become a third-party developer. The following December, Sega released an expanded port of Sonic Adventure 2 for Nintendo's GameCube. Afterward, Sonic Team USA developed the first multi-platform Sonic game, Sonic Heroes (2003), for the GameCube, Microsoft's Xbox, and Sony's PlayStation 2. The game, again directed by Iizuka, was designed for a broad audience, and Sonic Team revived elements not seen since the Genesis era, such as special stages and the Chaotix characters. Reviews for Sonic Heroes were mixed; while its graphics and gameplay were praised, critics felt it failed to address the problems of previous Sonic games, such as the camera. Iizuka later reflected that developing Heroes was the most stressful experience in his career; he lost 22 pounds due to the crunch conditions he worked under. Sonic Team also ported Sonic Adventure with additional content to the GameCube in 2003 and Windows in 2004, to mixed reviews.

Sega continued to release 2D Sonic games. In 1999, it collaborated with SNK to produce Sonic the Hedgehog Pocket Adventure, an adaptation of Sonic 2 for the Neo Geo Pocket Color. Some SNK staff formed Dimps the following year, and developed original 2D Sonic games—Sonic Advance (2001), Sonic Advance 2 (2002), and Sonic Advance 3 (2004)—for Nintendo's Game Boy Advance (GBA). Sonic Advance was the first original Sonic game released for a Nintendo console after Sega and Nintendo's fierce rivalry in the 1990s. It was outsourced to Dimps because Sonic Team was understaffed with employees familiar with the GBA. Dimps also developed Sonic Rush (2005) for the Nintendo DS, which uses a 2.5D perspective. Dimps's projects received generally favorable reviews. To introduce older games to new fans, Sonic Team developed two compilations, Sonic Mega Collection (2002) and Sonic Gems Collection (2005). Further spin-offs included the party game Sonic Shuffle (2000), the pinball game Sonic Pinball Party (2003), and the fighting game Sonic Battle (2003).

2005–2010: Franchise struggles 
Sonic Team USA was renamed Sega Studios USA after completing Sonic Heroes. Sega and Sonic Team leadership became in constant flux while they began experimenting with diverging from the established Sonic formula. Sega Studios USA's first post-Heroes project was Shadow the Hedgehog (2005), a spin-off starring the popular Adventure 2 character Shadow. While Shadow retains most elements from previous Sonic games, it was aimed at a mature audience and introduced third-person shooting and nonlinear gameplay. Shadow the Hedgehog was panned for its controls, level design, and mature themes, but was a commercial success, selling at least 1.59 million units.

For the franchise's 15th anniversary in 2006, Sonic Team developed Sonic Riders, Sonic the Hedgehog, and a GBA port of the original Sonic. Sonic Riders, the first Sonic racing game since Sonic R, was designed to appeal extreme sports fans as well as regular Sonic fans. With a more realistic setting than previous entries, Sonic the Hedgehog—commonly referred to as Sonic '06—was intended to reboot the series for seventh-generation consoles such as the Xbox 360 and PlayStation 3. The development faced serious problems; Naka, the last of the original Sonic development team, resigned as head of Sonic Team to form Prope, and the team split so work could begin on a Nintendo Wii Sonic game. According to Iizuka, these incidents, coupled with stringent Sega deadlines and an unpolished game engine, forced Sonic Team to rush development. None of the 15th-anniversary Sonic games were successful critically, and Sonic '06 became regarded as the worst game in the series, panned for its bugs, camera, controls, and story. Brian Shea of Game Informer wrote that it "[became] synonymous with the struggles the Sonic the Hedgehog franchise had faced in recent years. Sonic ['06] was meant to be a return to the series' roots, but it ended up damning the franchise in the eyes of many."

The first Sonic game for the Wii, Sonic and the Secret Rings (2007), takes place in the world of Arabian Nights and was released instead of a port of Sonic '06. Citing lengthy development times, Sega switched plans and conceived a game that would use the motion detection of the Wii Remote. Sega released a sequel, Sonic and the Black Knight, set in the world of King Arthur, in 2009. Secret Rings and Black Knight form what is known as the Sonic Storybook sub-series. A Sonic Riders sequel, Zero Gravity (2008), was developed for the Wii and PlayStation 2. Dimps returned to the Sonic series with Sonic Rush Adventure, a sequel to Sonic Rush, in 2007, while BioWare developed the first Sonic RPG, Sonic Chronicles: The Dark Brotherhood (2008), also for the DS. Backbone Entertainment developed two Sonic games exclusive to the PlayStation Portable, Sonic Rivals (2006) and Sonic Rivals 2 (2007).

Following Naka's departure, Akinori Nishiyama, who worked on the Sonic Advance and Rush games, became Sonic Team's general manager. Sonic Team began working on Sonic Unleashed (2008) in 2005. It was conceived as a sequel to Adventure 2, but became a standalone entry after Sonic Team introduced innovations to separate it from the Adventure games. With Unleashed, Sonic Team sought to combine the best aspects of 2D and 3D Sonic games and address criticisms of previous 3D entries, although reviews were mixed due to the addition of a beat 'em up game mode in which Sonic transforms into a werewolf-like beast. After Nishiyama was promoted in 2010, Iizuka was installed as the head of Sonic Team and became the Sonic producer.

2010–present: Refocusing and new directions 
Iizuka felt Sonic was struggling because it lacked unified direction, so Sonic Team refocused on more traditional side-scrolling elements and fast-paced gameplay. Sonic the Hedgehog 4, a side-scrolling episodic sequel to Sonic & Knuckles co-developed by Sonic Team and Dimps, began with Episode I in 2010, followed by Episode II in 2012. Later in 2010, Sega released Sonic Colors for the Wii and DS, which expanded on the well received aspects of Unleashed and introduced the Wisp power-ups. For the series' 20th anniversary in 2011, Sega released Sonic Generations for the Xbox 360, PlayStation 3, and Windows; a separate version was developed by Dimps for the Nintendo 3DS. Sonic Generations featured reimagined versions of levels from previous Sonic games and reintroduced the "classic" Sonic design from the Genesis era. These efforts were better received, especially in comparison to Sonic '06 and Unleashed.

In May 2013, Nintendo announced it was collaborating with Sega to produce Sonic games for its Wii U and 3DS platforms. The first game in the partnership, 2013's Sonic Lost World, was also the first Sonic game for eighth-generation hardware. Sonic Lost World was designed to be streamlined and fluid in movement and design, borrowing elements from Nintendo's Super Mario Galaxy games and the canceled X-treme. The second was Mario & Sonic at the Sochi 2014 Olympic Winter Games (2013) for the Wii U, the fourth Mario & Sonic game and a 2014 Winter Olympics tie-in (see Crossovers section). The deal was completed in 2014 with the release of Sonic Boom: Rise of Lyric for the Wii U and Sonic Boom: Shattered Crystal for the 3DS; these games were based on the Sonic Boom television series. Sonic Lost World polarized critics, while critics found Mario & Sonic at the Sochi 2014 Olympic Winter Games mediocre and panned the Sonic Boom games. Sonic Boom: Fire & Ice, a Shattered Crystal sequel, was released in 2016.

Sega began to release more Sonic games for mobile phones, such as iOS and Android devices. After Australian programmer Christian "Taxman" Whitehead developed a version of Sonic CD for modern consoles in 2011, he collaborated with fellow Sonic fan Simon "Stealth" Thomley to develop remasters of the original Sonic the Hedgehog and Sonic the Hedgehog 2 for iOS and Android, which were released in 2013. The remasters were developed using Whitehead's Retro Engine, an engine tailored for 2D projects, and received praise. Sonic Dash (2013), a Temple Run-style endless runner, was developed by Hardlight and downloaded over 350 million times by 2020 and received a Sonic Boom-themed sequel in 2015. Sonic Team released Sonic Runners, its first game for mobile devices, in 2015. Sonic Runners was also an endless runner, but was unsuccessful and was discontinued a year after release. Gameloft released a sequel, Sonic Runners Adventure, in 2017 to generally positive reviews.

In a 2015 interview with Polygon, Iizuka acknowledged that contemporary Sonic games had been disappointing. He hoped, from then on, that the Sonic Team logo would stand as a "mark of quality"; he planned to release quality games and expand the Sonic brand, while retaining the modern Sonic design. Iizuka and most of Sonic Team relocated to Burbank, California to oversee the franchise with a new team. At the San Diego Comic-Con in July 2016, Sega announced two Sonic games to coincide with the series' 25th anniversary: Sonic Mania and Sonic Forces. Both were released for the PlayStation 4, Xbox One, Nintendo Switch, and Windows in 2017. Sonic Mania was developed by the independent game developers PagodaWest Games and Headcannon with a staff comprising members of the Sonic fandom; Whitehead conceived the project and served as director. The game, which emulates the gameplay and visuals of the Genesis entries, received the best reviews for a Sonic game in 15 years. Meanwhile, Sonic Team developed Sonic Forces, which revives the dual gameplay of Sonic Generations along with a third gameplay style featuring the player's custom character. Sonic Forces received mixed reviews, with criticism for its short length.

In 2019, Sega released a kart racing game, Team Sonic Racing (2019), developed by Sumo Digital. In May 2021, Sega announced several Sonic projects for the series' 30th anniversary, including a remaster of Sonic Colors, the compilation Sonic Origins, and the 2022 game Sonic Frontiers. Frontiers was the first Sonic game to feature open-world inspired design, and Iizuka expressed hope that it would inform future games in a similar way to Sonic Adventure. Frontiers received moderately positive reviews, with critics and fans considering it a flawed but solid new direction for the franchise, and sold strongly.

Characters and story 

The Sonic franchise is known for its large cast of characters; Sonic the Fighters (1996) producer Yu Suzuki joked that anyone who makes a Sonic game has the duty to create new characters. The first game introduced Sonic, a blue hedgehog who can run at incredible speeds, and Doctor Eggman, a rotund mad scientist. During the Genesis era, Eggman was referred to as Doctor Ivo Robotnik in Western territories. Sega of America's Dean Sitton made the change without consulting the Japanese developers, who did not want a single character to have two different names. Since Sonic Adventure, the character has been referred to as Eggman in all territories, although the Robotnik name is still acknowledged.

Sonic games traditionally follow Sonic's efforts to stop Eggman, who schemes to obtain the Chaos Emeralds—seven emeralds with mystical powers. The Emeralds can turn thoughts into power, warp time and space with a technique called Chaos Control, give energy to living things, and be used to create nuclear or laser-based weaponry. They typically act as MacGuffins in the stories. Eggman seeks the Emeralds in his quest to conquer the world, and traps animals in aggressive robots and prison capsules. Because Sonic Team was inspired by the culture of the 1990s, Sonic features environmental themes. Sonic represents "nature", while Eggman represents "machinery" and "development"—a play on the then-growing debate between environmentalists and developers.

Much of the supporting cast was introduced in the succeeding games for the Genesis and its add-ons. Sonic 2 introduced Sonic's sidekick Miles "Tails" Prower, a fox who can fly using his two tails. Sonic CD introduced Amy Rose, a pink hedgehog and Sonic's self-proclaimed girlfriend, and Metal Sonic, a robotic doppelgänger of Sonic created by Eggman. Sonic 3 introduced Sonic's rival Knuckles, a red echidna and the guardian of the Master Emerald. The Master Emerald, introduced in Sonic & Knuckles, controls the power of the Chaos Emeralds. Knuckles' Chaotix introduced the Chaotix, a group comprising Espio the Chameleon, Vector the Crocodile, and Charmy Bee. A number of characters introduced during this period, such as Mighty the Armadillo and Ray the Flying Squirrel from SegaSonic the Hedgehog and Fang the Sniper from Sonic Triple Trouble (1994), faded into obscurity, although they sometimes reappear.

During Sonic Adventure development, Sonic Team discovered that the relatively simple character designs did not suit a 3D environment. The art style was modernized to alter the characters' proportions and make them appeal to Western audiences. Since Sonic Adventure, the series' cast has expanded. Notable characters include Big, a large cat who fishes for his pet frog Froggy; the E-100 Series of robots; Shadow, a brooding black hedgehog; Rouge, a treasure-hunting bat; Blaze, a cat from an alternate dimension; and Silver, a telekinetic hedgehog from the future. The Chao creatures function as digital pets and minor gameplay elements, and Wisp creatures function as power-ups. Flicky, the blue bird from Sega's 1984 arcade game, appears in several Sonic games, most notably 3D Blast.

Some Sonic characters have featured in spin-off games. Eggman is the featured character of Dr. Robotnik's Mean Bean Machine, a Western localization of Puyo Puyo. Sega replaced the Puyo Puyo characters with Sonic characters because it feared Puyo Puyo would not be popular with a Western audience. In 1995, Sega released the Knuckles spinoff Knuckles' Chaotix for the 32X, and two Tails spin-offs for Game Gear: Tails' Skypatrol (a scrolling shooter) and Tails Adventure (a Metroidvania game). Shadow the Hedgehog (2005) was developed in response to the Shadow character's popularity and to introduce "gun action" gameplay to the franchise. Iizuka has said that future spin-offs, such as sequels to Knuckles' Chaotix and Shadow the Hedgehog or a Big the Cat game, remain possibilities.

Gameplay 

The Sonic series is characterized by speed-based platforming gameplay. Controlling the player character, the player navigates a series of levels at high speeds while jumping between platforms, fighting enemies and bosses, and avoiding obstacles. The series contains both 2D and 3D games. 2D entries generally feature simple, pinball-like gameplay—with jumping and attacking controlled by a single button—and branching level paths that require memorization to maintain speed. Meanwhile, 3D entries tend to be more linear in design, feature various level objectives, different movesets, and allow players to upgrade and customize the playable character. Games since Sonic Unleashed have blended 2D and 3D gameplay, with the camera shifting between side-scrolling and third-person perspectives.

One distinctive game mechanic of Sonic games are collectible golden rings spread throughout levels, which act as a form of health. Players possessing rings can survive upon sustaining damage, but the rings are scattered and the player has a short amount of time to re-collect some of them before they disappear. Collecting 100 rings usually rewards the player an extra life. Rings have other uses in certain games, such as currency in Sonic '06, restoring health bars in Sonic Unleashed, or improving statistics in Sonic Riders. Levels in Sonic games feature elements such as slopes, bottomless pits, and vertical loops. Springs, springboards, and dash panels are scattered throughout and catapult the player at high speeds in a particular direction. Players' progress in levels is saved through passing checkpoints. Checkpoints serve other uses in various games, such as entering bonus stages. Some settings, most notably Green Hill Zone, recur throughout the series.

The series contains numerous power-ups, which are held in boxes that appear throughout levels. An icon indicates what it contains, and the player releases the item by destroying the box. Common items in boxes include rings, a shield, invincibility, high speed, and extra lives. Sonic Colors introduces the Wisps, a race of extraterrestrial creatures that act as power-ups. Each Wisp has its own special ability corresponding to its color; for instance, yellow Wisps allow players to drill underground and find otherwise inaccessible areas.

In most Sonic games, the goal is to collect the Chaos Emeralds; the player is required to collect them all to defeat Eggman and achieve the games' good endings. Sonic games that do not feature the Chaos Emeralds, such as Sonic CD, feature different collectibles that otherwise function the same. Players find the Emeralds by entering portals, opening portals using 50 rings, or scouting them within levels themselves. Sometimes, the Emeralds are collected automatically as the story progresses. By collecting the Emeralds, players are rewarded with their characters' "Super" form and can activate it by collecting 50 rings in a stage. The Super transformations grant the player character more speed, a farther jump, and invincibility, but their ring count drains by the second; the transformation lasts until all the rings have been used. Some games require the player to collect all the Chaos Emeralds to reach the final boss.

Sonic games often share basic gameplay, but some have game mechanics that distinguish them from others. For instance, Knuckles' Chaotix is similar to previous entries in the series, but introduces a partner system whereby the player is connected to another character via a tether; the tether behaves like a rubber band and must be used to maneuver the characters. Sonic Unleashed introduces the Werehog, a beat 'em up gameplay style in which Sonic transforms into a werewolf-like beast and must fight enemies using brute strength. Both the Sonic Storybook games feature unique concepts: Secret Rings is controlled exclusively using the Wii Remote's motion detection, which Black Knight incorporates hack and slash gameplay. While some games feature Sonic as the only playable character, others feature multiple, who have alternate movesets and storylines. For instance, in Sonic & Knuckles, Knuckles goes through the same levels as Sonic, but his story is different, he explores different parts of the levels, and certain areas are more difficult.

Many Sonic games contain multiplayer and cooperative gameplay, beginning with Sonic the Hedgehog 2. In some games, if the player chooses to control Sonic and Tails together, a second player can join at any time and control Tails separately. Sonic games also feature a split-screen competitive mode in which two players race to the end of the stage.

Music 

For the original Sonic the Hedgehog, Sega commissioned Masato Nakamura, bassist and songwriter of the J-pop band Dreams Come True, to compose the soundtrack. Nakamura returned to compose Sonic 2 soundtrack. Dreams Come True owns the rights to Nakamura's score, which created problems when the Sonic Spinball team used his Sonic theme music without permission. For Sonic CD, two soundtracks were composed; the original, featured in the Japanese and European releases, was composed by Naofumi Hataya and Masafumi Ogata, while the North American score was composed by Spencer Nilsen, David Young, and Mark Crew.

A number of composers contributed to the Sonic the Hedgehog 3 score, including Sega sound staff and independent contractors recruited to finish the game on schedule. According to conflicting sources, American pop musician Michael Jackson, a Sonic fan, composed music for Sonic 3. Ohshima and Hector said Jackson's involvement was terminated and his music removed following the first allegations of sexual abuse against him, but composers involved with the project said his contributions remained.

Sonic 3 was the first Sonic game composer Jun Senoue worked on. Senoue has composed the music for many Sonic games since Sonic 3D Blast, often with his band Crush 40, which he formed with Hardline vocalist Johnny Gioeli. While the Genesis Sonic soundtracks were characterized by electropop, Senoue's scores typically feature funk and rock music. Tomoya Ohtani has been the series' sound director since Sonic the Hedgehog in 2006, and was the lead composer for that game, Sonic Unleashed, Sonic Colors, Sonic Lost World, Sonic Runners, and Sonic Forces. Ohtani said he attempts to "express through music the greatest features each game has", citing the diverse and energetic score of Sonic Unleashed and the more science fiction-style score of Sonic Colors as examples.

Other composers who have contributed to Sonic games include Richard Jacques and Hideki Naganuma. Tee Lopes—known for releasing unofficial remixes of Sonic tracks on YouTube—was the lead composer for Sonic Mania and a contributor to Team Sonic Racing. The main theme of the 2006 Sonic the Hedgehog was performed by Ali Tabatabaee and Matty Lewis of the band Zebrahead, while Akon remixed "Sweet Sweet Sweet" for its soundtrack. Doug Robb, the lead singer of Hoobastank, performed the main theme of Sonic Forces. One of the ending themes of Sonic Frontiers, "Vandalize", was performed by the Japanese rock band One Ok Rock.

Other media

Crossovers 

Outside the Sonic series, Sonic appears in other Sonic Team games as a playable character in Christmas Nights (1996), a power-up in Billy Hatcher and the Giant Egg (2003), and in a cameo in the 2008 Wii version of Samba de Amigo (1999). Sonic characters also feature in the Sega All-Stars series, which includes Sega Superstars (2004), Sega Superstars Tennis (2008), and Sumo Digital's kart racing games Sonic & Sega All-Stars Racing (2010) and Sonic & All-Stars Racing Transformed (2012).

Since 2007, Sega has collaborated with former rival Nintendo to produce Mario & Sonic, an Olympic Games-themed crossover with the Mario franchise. The first Mario & Sonic game was released in 2007 for the Wii and in 2008 for the DS to tie in with the 2008 Summer Olympics. Mario & Sonic at the Olympic Winter Games, based on the 2010 Winter Olympics, was released in 2010 for the Wii and DS, and Mario & Sonic at the London 2012 Olympic Games, based on the 2012 Summer Olympics, was released for the Wii in 2011 and the 3DS in 2012. The fourth game, 2013's Mario & Sonic at the Sochi 2014 Olympic Winter Games, was exclusive to the Wii U, but the following game, Mario & Sonic at the Rio 2016 Olympic Games (2016), was released on both the Wii U and 3DS. After a brief hiatus, the series made a return in 2019 with Mario & Sonic at the Olympic Games Tokyo 2020 for the Switch, based on the 2020 Summer Olympics.

Sonic appears as a playable character in Nintendo's Super Smash Bros. crossover fighting games, beginning with Super Smash Bros. Brawl in 2008. Alongside Solid Snake from Konami's Metal Gear franchise, Sonic was the first non-Nintendo character to appear in Smash. He was considered for inclusion in Super Smash Bros. Melee (2001), but the game was too close to completion so his introduction was delayed until Brawl. He returned in the sequels Super Smash Bros. for Nintendo 3DS and Wii U (2014) and Super Smash Bros. Ultimate (2018). Shadow and Knuckles appear in Smash as non-playable characters, while Tails and Knuckles costumes are available for players' Mii avatars. A Sonic amiibo figurine was released for the Smash games, and is also compatible with Mario Kart 8 (2014), Super Mario Maker (2015), and Yoshi's Woolly World (2015).

In June 2015, characters from the Angry Birds RPG Angry Birds Epic (2014) appeared as playable characters in Sonic Dash during a three-week promotion, while Sonic was added to Angry Birds Epic as a playable character the following September. Similar crossovers with the Sanrio characters Hello Kitty, Badtz-Maru, My Melody, and Chococat and the Namco game Pac-Man took place in December 2016 and February 2018. In November 2016, a Sonic expansion pack was released for the toys-to-life game Lego Dimensions (2015); the pack includes Sonic as a playable character, in addition to Sonic levels and vehicles. In September 2021, Sonic and Tails became playable characters in Cookie Run: Kingdom.

Animation 

In 1992, Sega approached the American Broadcasting Company (ABC) about producing two television series—"a syndicated show for the after-school audience" and a Saturday-morning cartoon—based on Sonic. Kalinske "had seen how instrumental the launch of He-Man and the Masters of the Universe cartoon series was to the success of the toyline" during his time at Mattel and believed that success could be recreated using Sonic. The two cartoons, the syndicated Adventures of Sonic the Hedgehog (1993) and ABC's Sonic the Hedgehog (1993–1994), were produced by DIC Entertainment. DIC also produced a Sonic Christmas special in 1996, and Sonic Underground in 1999, to promote Sonic Adventure. DIC's Sonic adaptations are generally not held in high regard.

Adventures of Sonic the Hedgehog comprises 65 episodes overseen by Ren & Stimpy director Kent Butterworth and features slapstick humor in the vein of Looney Tunes. The 26-episode Sonic the Hedgehog (commonly called Sonic SatAM) features a bleak setting in which Eggman has conquered the world, while Sonic is a member of a resistance force that opposes him. The series was canceled after two seasons. Sonic Underground was planned to last 65 episodes, but only 40 were produced. The series follows Sonic and his siblings Manic and Sonia, who use the power of music to fight Eggman and reunite with their mother. In all three DiC series, Sonic is voiced by Family Matters star Jaleel White.

In Japan, Sega and Sonic Team collaborated with Studio Pierrot to produce a two-part original video animation (OVA), Sonic the Hedgehog, released direct-to-video in Japan in 1996. To coincide with Sonic Adventure Western release in 1999, ADV Films released the OVA in North America as a 55-minute film, Sonic the Hedgehog: The Movie. Produced with input from Naka and Ohshima, the OVA is loosely based on Sonic CD, with elements from Sonic the Hedgehog 2 and 3, and recounts Sonic's efforts to stop a generator taken over by Eggman from exploding and destroying their world. Patrick Lee of The A.V. Club said the OVA was "the only cartoon to adapt the look, sound, and feel of the Sonic games", with familiar scenes and music.

Sonic X, an anime series produced by TMS Entertainment and overseen by Naka, ran for three seasons (78 episodes) from 2003 to 2006. While previous series' episodes feature self-contained plots, Sonic X tells a single serialized story. The Sonic cast teleports from their home planet to Earth during a scuffle with Eggman, where they meet a human boy, Chris Thorndyke. Throughout the course of the series, Sonic and his friends attempt to return to their world while fighting Eggman. The second season adapts the Sonic Adventure games and Sonic Battle, while the third season sees the friends return with Chris to their world, where they enter outer space and fight an army of aliens. Some critics enjoyed Sonic X, while others disliked it. Although it suffered from poor ratings in Japan, Sonic X consistently topped ratings for its timeslot in the US and France.

Sonic Boom, a computer-animated series produced by Sega and Genao Productions, premiered on Cartoon Network in November 2014. It features a satirical take on the Sonic mythos, and the franchise's cast was redesigned for it. According to Iizuka, Sonic Boom came about as a desire to appeal more to Western audiences, and it ran parallel with the main Sonic franchise. Sonic Boom lasted for two seasons and the last episode aired in 2017. In May 2020, Sega brand officer Ivo Gerscovich stated that no further episodes of Sonic Boom would be produced.

To promote the release of Sonic Mania Plus (2018), a five-part series of animated shorts, Sonic Mania Adventures, was released on the Sonic the Hedgehog YouTube channel between March 30 and July 17, 2018. The series depicts Sonic's return to his world following the events of Sonic Forces, teaming up with his friends to prevent Eggman and Metal Sonic from collecting the Chaos Emeralds and Master Emerald. An additional Christmas-themed episode was released on December 21, 2018. The shorts were written and directed by Tyson Hesse, who created Sonic Mania opening cutscene. Similarly, Hesse produced a two-part animated series to tie in with the release of Team Sonic Racing in 2019. Sonic and Tails also appeared as guest stars in OK K.O.! Let's Be Heroes in August 2019.

Sonic Prime, a computer-animated Sonic series, is available on Netflix. The series is co-produced by Netflix Animation, Sega of America, WildBrain Studios, and Man of Action Entertainment and premiered in December 2022.

Comics 

Shogakukan published a Sonic the Hedgehog manga series in its Shogaku Yonensei magazine, beginning in 1992. Written by Kenji Terada and illustrated by Sango Norimoto, it follows a sweet but cowardly young hedgehog named Nicky whose alter ego is the cocky, heroic Sonic. According to character artist Kazuyuki Hoshino, the manga was part of Sega's promotional strategy to appeal to primary school children. The Sonic design team worked with Shogakukan to create new characters; Amy Rose and Charmy Bee originated in the manga before appearing in the games.

The longest-running Sonic-based publication is the 290-issue Sonic the Hedgehog, an American comic book published by Archie Comics from 1993 until its cancellation in 2017. Archie also published a number of spin-offs, such as Knuckles the Echidna (1997–2000) and Sonic Universe (2009–2017). Archie's comic drew its premise from the Sonic the Hedgehog television series, with Sonic and a resistance force fighting the dictator Eggman. Originally written as a "straightforward lighthearted action-comedy", Sonic the Hedgehog became more dramatic after Ken Penders began writing it with issue #11. Penders remained the head writer for the following 150 issues and developed an elaborate lore unique to the series. Ian Flynn became head writer in 2006 and remained until the series' cancellation. Following a legal battle with Penders over ownership of characters he created, in 2013 the series was rebooted, leaving only characters introduced in the games or which predated Penders' run.

In 2008, Guinness World Records recognized Archie's Sonic the Hedgehog as the longest-running comic based on a video game, and by 2016 it was one of the longest-running American comics in the market. While Archie planned to publish at least four issues beyond #290, in January 2017 the series went on an abrupt hiatus, and in July, Sega announced it was ending its business relationship with Archie in favor of a new partnership with IDW Publishing. IDW's Sonic comic began in April 2018. Although the creative teams from the Archie series, such as Flynn, returned, the IDW series is set in a different continuity. Flynn said the IDW series differs from the Archie comic in that it draws from the games for stories, with the first story arc set after the events of Sonic Forces. Fans continued the Archie series unofficially, including finishing unpublished issues, while Penders is using the characters he gained ownership of for a graphic novel, The Lara-Su Chronicles.

Sonic the Comic, a British comic published by Fleetway Publications, ran for 223 issues from 1993 to 2002; contributors included Richard Elson, Nigel Kitching, Andy Diggle, and Nigel Dobbyn. It featured stories aimed at children, in addition to news and review sections. Although it adapted the stories of the games, the writers established their own lore. The final story arc was a loose adaptation of Sonic Adventure in 2000, followed by 39 issues reprinting old stories. Following the series' cancellation, fans started Sonic the Comic Online, an unofficial webcomic that continues the stories.

Live-action film franchise 
In August 1994, Sega of America signed a deal with Metro-Goldwyn-Mayer Pictures and Trilogy Entertainment to produce a live-action animated film to tie in with Sonic X-treme. In May 1995, screenwriter Richard Jefferies pitched a treatment, Sonic the Hedgehog: Wonders of the World, to Sega. It saw Sonic and Eggman escape from Sonic X-treme into the real world and Sonic collaborate with a boy to stop Eggman. No agreement was reached and the film was canceled. With permission from Sega, Jeffries pitched his treatment to DreamWorks Animation, but it was rejected.

Sonic the Hedgehog (2020) 

In 2013, Sony Pictures Entertainment acquired the Sonic film rights, and in June 2014 announced it would produce a Sonic film as a joint venture with Sega's Marza Animation Planet. Neal H. Moritz was attached to produce under his Original Film banner, alongside Takeshi Ito, Mie Onishi, and Toru Nakahara. In February 2016, Sega CEO Hajime Satomi said the film was scheduled for 2018. Blur Studio's Tim Miller and Jeff Fowler were hired the following October to develop the film; Fowler would make his feature directorial debut, while both would executive produce. In October 2017, Paramount Pictures acquired the rights after Sony put the film into turnaround. However, most of the production team remained unchanged, and principal photography began in September 2018 in Ladysmith, British Columbia.

The film, written by Patrick Casey and Josh Miller, follows Sonic (voiced by Ben Schwartz) as he journeys to San Francisco with a small-town cop (James Marsden) so he can escape Eggman (Jim Carrey) and collect his missing rings. Additional cast members include Tika Sumpter, Adam Pally, and Neal McDonough, while Colleen O'Shaughnessey reprises her voice role as Tails from the games for a mid-credits scene cameo. Sonic was initially redesigned to be more realistic, with fur, new running shoes, separate eyes and a more humanlike physique. The design triggered a backlash; it was criticized for not resembling the game design and provoked an uncanny valley-type of repulsed response from viewers. As such, Sonic was revised to better resemble the original design.

Paramount originally scheduled Sonic the Hedgehog for a November 8, 2019 release, but delayed it to February 14, 2020, to accommodate the redesign. The film received generally positive reviews from critics, who felt it exceeded the low expectations typically associated with video game-based films; Carrey's performance in particular was praised. Criticism was directed at a perceived lack of originality or ambition, and while Sonic's second redesign was praised, some felt it set a negative precedent for the film industry by giving fans the power to influence the filmmakers. With an estimated budget of $81–95 million, the film grossed over $310 million worldwide, becoming the sixth-highest-grossing film of 2020. In March, it became the highest-grossing film based on a video game in US box office history.

Sonic the Hedgehog 2 (2022) 

Sonic the Hedgehog 2 was announced in May 2020, and principal photography began in March 2021. It features Sonic and Tails attempting to stop Eggman, with Knuckles' help, from finding the Master Emerald. Schwartz, O'Shaughnessey, Marsden, Carrey, and Sumpter reprise their roles from the first film, while Idris Elba voices Knuckles. Much of the crew, including Fowler, Casey, and Josh Miller, returned.

Sonic 2 incorporates more aspects of the Sonic games than the first film, including the Chaos Emeralds and Super Sonic. It adapts plot elements from Sonic 2 and Sonic 3, and introduces Shadow in the mid-credits scene. Sonic the Hedgehog 2 was released on April 8, 2022. It received positive reviews and grossed over $402 million worldwide, surpassing its predecessor as the highest-grossing video game film in the US.

Future 
In February 2022, Paramount and Sega announced that they were working on a Sonic cinematic universe, with Sonic the Hedgehog 3 and a Knuckles streaming television series for Paramount+ in development. Elba is set to reprise his voice role in the series.

Merchandise 
Licensed Sonic merchandise includes books, clothing, soundtracks, board games, and toys such as figures and plushes. Sega and McDonald's collaborated for Sonic-themed Happy Meal promotions in 1994 for Sonic 3 and in 2004 for Sonic Heroes. Sonic was the first video game franchise promoted in McDonald's, and over  Sonic Happy Meal toys were sold worldwide. A million pairs of Sonic trousers were sold by 1996. 

First4Figures has produced a large number of vinyl and resin Sonic figures since 2008. In January 2012, Sega and RHM Solutions opened an online Sonic store, while PlayStation Gear began selling Sonic items in December 2017. Sega and The Lego Group collaborated to produce a Green Hill Zone Lego set in 2021, after it was suggested on Lego Ideas in 2019.

Reception and legacy

Commentary 

The Sonic platformers released during the 1990s were acclaimed and have been listed among the greatest video games of all time. The original Sonic was touted as a faster, cooler alternative to Nintendo's Super Mario World (1990). According to Kotaku Zolani Stewart, Sonic's rebellious character was representative of the culture of the 1990s, "when the idea of individual rebellion seemed inextricably linked to consumer culture". Writing in The Guardian, Keith Stuart observed that Sonic the Hedgehogs emphasis on speed departed from accepted precepts of game design, requiring that players "learn through repetition rather than observation" as "the levels aren't designed to be seen or even understood in one playthrough... Sonic is incorrect game design and yet ... it's a masterpiece." Sonic 2, Sonic CD, Sonic 3, and Sonic & Knuckles were praised for building on the first game's formula; in 1996, Next Generation described them as "the zeitgeist of the 16-bit era".

After the uneventful Saturn era, the series found renewed popularity during the sixth generation of video game consoles. Sonic Adventure, though criticized for its glitches and camera system, was acclaimed for its visuals, spectacle, and varied gameplay; Sonic Adventure 2 was met with similar praise. However, journalists began to feel the series was straying from its roots, with some commenting that Sonic Adventure failed to reinvent Sonic for the 3D era as Super Mario 64 had for Mario. Stewart argued that the addition of voice acting and greater focus on plot changed Sonic into "a flat, lifeless husk of a character, who spits out slogans and generally has only one personality mode, the radical attitude dude, the sad recycled image of vague '90s cultural concept". Edwin Evans-Thirlwell of Eurogamer agreed, writing that Mario's "plucky earnestness and whimsy will always enjoy a longer shelf-life than [Sonic's] over-compensatory edginess".

After the Dreamcast, the series' critical standing declined. Evans-Thirlwell summarized further 3D Sonic games as "20-odd years of slowly accumulating bullshit". Although reviews for Sonic Heroes were mostly favorable, Stewart said this was when the focus on story and cutscenes became unbearable. Shadow the Hedgehog was widely criticized as a misguided attempt to bring a sense of maturity to the franchise, and Sonic '06 was critically panned. The Sonic Mania developer Christian Whitehead said that the changes to the Sonic formula "stemmed from a – perhaps misplaced – desire to continue to push Sonic as a AAA brand". Journalists, Whitehead, and the former Sega of America marketing director Al Nilsen criticized the number of characters added to the series, which Naka had justified as necessary to please fans. Evans-Thirlwell argued that Sonic Team had never successfully translated the momentum-based gameplay of the Genesis games to 3D, and that unlike Mario, Sonic never had a 3D "transcendental hit". Simon Parkin of The Guardian noted that whereas the Mario creator Shigeru Miyamoto reviews every Mario game prior to release, the individuals who had shaped Sonic (Naka, Ohshima, and Cerny) left Sega.

Despite the critical decline, Dimps' side-scrolling Sonic games for the GBA and DS were consistently praised. Writing for Destructoid, Jim Sterling said: "Hyperbole states that we haven't had a good Sonic game since Sonic Adventure, which really betrays how much we gamers ignore the handheld market... Sonic Advance and the Sonic Rush games have often ranged from decent to superb, which makes one wonder why Dimps is the 'B' team and the inferior Sonic Team is the 'A' team." In the wake of the 2006 Sonic the Hedgehog, Brett Elston of GamesRadar+ said that Sonic Rush Adventure "managed to keep the [series'] spirit alive". While Sonic Unleashed was criticized for its addition of beat 'em up gameplay, which IGN Hilary Goldstein bemoaned had "nothing to do with Sonic whatsoever", its speed-based platforming levels were widely praised; critics suggested that the game would have been better received if it had focused on them.

In October 2010, Sega de-listed Sonic games with average or below-average scores on the review aggregator website Metacritic, to increase the value of the brand and avoid confusing customers. That month, Sonic the Hedgehog 4: Episode I was released to general praise, with Goldstein summarizing it as "short but sweet and well worth downloading". Sonic Colors, released shortly afterward, was hailed as a return to form, as was 2011's Sonic Generations. Though Evans-Thirlwell considered Sonic Generations the best 3D Sonic game, he called it "an admission of defeat" for depicting the 2D and 3D incarnations of Sonic "together only to remind us of their profound differences". Sonic Lost World was released in 2013 to more mixed reviews, with some critics considering it a fresh take on the Sonic formula and others a poorly designed mess. The two Sonic Boom games received widespread negative reviews and sold only 490,000 copies combined by February 2015, making them the worst-selling Sonic games. That year, Iizuka admitted that Sonic Team had prioritized shipping games over quality and did not have enough involvement in third-party Sonic games such as Sonic Boom. The Sega CEO, Haruki Satomi, acknowledged that Sega in general had "partially betrayed" the trust of the longtime fans and hoped to focus on quality over quantity.

In June 2015, the Sonic public relations manager Aaron Webber took charge of the series' Twitter account. Under Webber, the account, @sonic_hedgehog, became renowned for posting internet memes and making self-deprecating comments about the Sonic franchise's critical decline. According to Allegra Frank of Polygon, Webber "had an important effect on the franchise, cultivating a new persona for the character, one that has created a renewed sense of hope". The announcement of Sonic Mania in 2016 brought further hope for the Sonic franchise's future. Journalists described it as a true continuation of the Genesis games, succeeding where previous Sonic games—such as Sonic Rush and Sonic 4—had failed. It became the best-reviewed Sonic game in 15 years upon its August 2017 release; Matt Espineli of GameSpot summarized it "exceed[ing] expectations of what a new game in the franchise can look and play like, managing to simultaneously be a charming celebration of the past and a natural progression of the series' classic 2D formula". Many called it one of the best games in the series and expressed excitement for Sonic future, although Sonic Forces, released a few months later, received mixed reviews.

Sales 
Sonic the Hedgehog is one of the bestselling video game franchises. The Mario & Sonic series alone sold over 19million units . Series sales and free-to-play mobile game downloads totaled  units by 2019, and over  units by 2020. In 1993, Sonic was tied with Mario as the highest-earning entertainment personalities of the year, each generating  ( adjusted for inflation) in digital game sales that year. In the United Kingdom, Sonic was the sixth-bestselling game franchise between 1996 and 2012.

Individual Sonic games have been bestsellers as well. The original game is the bestselling Genesis game, while Sonic the Hedgehog 2 is the bestselling Game Gear game, Sonic CD is the bestselling Sega CD game, and Sonic Adventure is the bestselling Dreamcast game. Sonic Adventure 2 is the eighth-bestselling GameCube game in the US and the bestselling GameCube game that was not published by Nintendo. Upon release, Sonic the Hedgehog 2 set records for being the fastest-selling game, selling out  copies worldwide within two weeks in 1992.

Effect on the industry 
Primarily because of its Genesis bundling, Sonic the Hedgehog contributed greatly to the console's popularity in North America. Between October and December 1991, the Genesis outsold its chief competitor, the Super Nintendo Entertainment System, by a two-to-one ratio; at its January 1992 peak Sega held 65 percent of the market for 16-bit consoles. Although Nintendo eventually reclaimed the number-one position, it was the first time since December 1985 that Nintendo had not led the console market. 1UP.com credited Sonic for "turning the course" of the 16-bit console wars, helping make Sega a dominant player and industry giant.

During the 16-bit era, Sonic inspired similar platformers starring animal mascots, including the Bubsy series, Aero the Acro-Bat (1993), James Pond 3 (1993), Earthworm Jim (1994), and Zero the Kamikaze Squirrel (1994). "Animal with attitude" games carried over to the 3D era, with the developers of Gex (1995) and Crash Bandicoot (1996) citing Sonic as a major inspiration. According to Levi Buchanan of IGN, "Sonic inspired so many of these copycats that they practically became an entire subgenre for the platformer." Thorpe commented that "it's hard to keep track of how many programmers have cited [Sonic the Hedgehog] as a bar against which they have measured their own work", while Phil Hornshaw of Complex noted that few animal mascot characters achieved the same success as Sonic. Regarding the series' influence on the video game industry, Thorpe wrote:

Computer and Video Games (CVG) magazine also credited Sonic the Hedgehog with helping to popularize console video games in the United Kingdom, where home computers previously dominated the home video game market. They said the success of Sonic the Hedgehog was "one of the main reasons for the popularity of" console video games in the United Kingdom.

Cultural impact 

One of the world's most popular video game characters, by 1992 Sonic was more recognizable to children ages 6 to 11 than Disney's Mickey Mouse. In 1993, Sonic became the first video game character to have a balloon in the Macy's Thanksgiving Day Parade, and he was one of the four characters inducted on the Walk of Game in 2005, alongside Mario, Link, and Master Chief. Additionally, a Japanese team developing the Radio & Plasma Wave Investigation (RPWI) instrumentation for the Jupiter Icy Moons Explorer spacecraft, to be launched by ESA and Airbus in 2023, received approval to use Sonic as the mascot. Sonic and Eggman appear as minor characters in the Walt Disney Animation Studios films Wreck-It Ralph (2012) and Ralph Breaks the Internet (2018), while Sonic makes cameos in Steven Spielberg's Ready Player One (2018) and Chip 'n Dale: Rescue Rangers (2022).

The franchise is known for its eccentric and passionate fandom, which produces unofficial media, including fangames, fan fiction, modifications and ROM hacks of existing games, fan films, and fan art. Caty McCarthy of USGamer noted that many fans have continued to support the series in spite of poorly received games like the 2006 Sonic the Hedgehog, and she credited the fandom with helping maintain public interest in the franchise. Notable Sonic fangames include Sonic After the Sequel (2013), set between the events of Sonic the Hedgehog 2 and 3, and Sonic Dreams Collection (2015), which satirizes the series' fandom. Sonic Mania development team included individuals who had worked on Sonic ROM hacks and fangames, while Iizuka said the character customization system in Sonic Forces was influenced by the Sonic community's tendency to create original characters. Summer of Sonic, an annual fan convention dedicated to the Sonic series and hosted in the United Kingdom, was founded by Svend Joscelyne and Adam Tuff and first held in 2008.

Sonic has inspired various internet memes, which have been acknowledged by Sega and referenced in games. "Sanic hegehog", a crude Sonic drawn in Microsoft Paint, originated in 2010; typically, the meme uses one of Sonic's catchphrases but with poor grammar. The Sonic Twitter account has made numerous references to it, and it appeared in official downloadable content for Sonic Forces on in-game shirts and as a visual gag in the Sonic the Hedgehog film. Sanic also inspired similar memes and parodies and was described by William Moo of Syfy Wire as "perfect proof of the twisted love and appreciation many have" for Sonic. In January 2018, players flooded the virtual reality game VRChat with avatars depicting "Ugandan Knuckles", a deformed version of Knuckles the Echidna. The character stemmed from a 2017 review of Sonic Lost World by YouTube user Gregzilla, as well as fans of PlayerUnknown's Battlegrounds streamer Forsen, who often reference the African country Uganda. The Ugandan Knuckles meme was controversial for its perceived racial insensitivity, and the creator of the avatar expressed regret over how it was used. In response, the Sonic Twitter account encouraged players to respect others and donate to a Ugandan charity through GlobalGiving.

The sonic hedgehog gene, first identified for its role in fruit fly embryonic development, was named after Sonic. Robert Riddle, then a postdoctoral fellow at the Tabin Lab, came up with the name after his wife bought a magazine containing an advert for Sonic. A mutation in the gene causes fly larvae to bear spiky denticles, reminiscent of Sonic.

Notes

References

External links 

 
  

 
Fantasy video games
Platform games
Sega Games franchises
Sonic the Hedgehog games
Sonic the Hedgehog series
Video game franchises introduced in 1991
Video games adapted into comics
Video games adapted into films
Video games adapted into television shows
Video games about animals
Video games about robots